The Houston Defender is an African-American newspaper published weekly in Houston, Texas. The newspaper was established October 11, 1930 by C. F. Richardson Sr., who was also publisher of the Houston Informer.  The Defender served as a community advocate in the pre-Civil Rights era with a focus on equal rights, improved high school curricula and anti-lynching laws.

Richardson died in 1939, and his son, C. F. Richardson Jr., took over the newspaper. Sonceria MessiahJiles purchased the newspaper in 1981. The 2008 readership was 60,000.

In 1993 the bi-monthly Campus Defender was created for a younger audience; its contributors are middle and high school students. The publication moved online in 2008.

See also
 Houston Forward Times
 African-American News and Issues
 History of the African-Americans in Houston

References

External links

 

Newspapers published in Houston
African-American newspapers
Newspapers established in 1930
African-American history in Houston
1930 establishments in Texas
Weekly newspapers published in Texas